The Art of Being a Girl is the third album by Julee Cruise and was released in 2002. Released nine years after her previous album, Cruise departs from the dream pop-laden sound of her first two releases for a more jazz and electronica sound.

Track listing
All tracks composed by Julee Cruise and J.J. McGeehan; except where noted.
"You're Staring at Me" - 3:43
"The Orbiting Beatnik (For Keith)" - 4:29
"Falling in Love..." (Julee Cruise, Mocean Worker) - 5:56
"The Art of Being a Girl" (Julee Cruise, J.J. McGeehan, Khan) - 4:57
"Everybody Knows" - 3:11
"9th Ave. Limbo" (Julee Cruise, Kevin Tooley) - 5:05
"Slow Hot Wind" (Henry Mancini, Norman Gimbel) - 3:58
"Cha Cha in the Dark" (Julee Cruise, Rick Strom) - 4:16
"Shine" - 4:17
"Beachcomber Voodoo" - 4:49
"Three Jack Swing" - 3:54
"The Fire in Me" - 8:52
"Falling" (Angelo Badalamenti, David Lynch) (hidden track) - 5:29

Personnel
Julee Cruise - vocals, vocal melodies
J.J. McGeehan - guitar, keyboards, percussion
Graham Hawthorne - additional drums
Barry Danielian - trumpet
Allison Cornell - viola
Marlon Saunders - vocals
Ari Benjamin - voice over
Technical
Julee Cruise - executive producer
Kevin Tooley, Khan, Mocean Worker, Rick Strom - special guest producers
Frank Fagnano - post-production engineer
Alissa Levin - design
Leslie Lyons - photography

References

External links
 

2003 albums
Julee Cruise albums
Warner Records albums